William Edward Saxton  (born June 28, 1946, in New York City) is an American hard bop tenor saxophonist.

He studied clarinet, composition and arrangement at the New England Conservatory in Boston, graduating in 1973 and worked with Pharoah Sanders, Jackie McLean and Bennie Maupin.  He began working with Dannie Richmond in 1979, and he later worked with Charlie Persip's big band and Errol Parker. He has worked with Frank Foster, Clark Terry, Carmen McRae, Nancy Wilson, Tito Puente, Mongo Santamaria, Roy Ayers, Bobby Watson and Roy Haynes.  He was a Friday-night regular at Nick's jazz pub in Harlem, before he fulfilled a dream of his and opened "New York's only Jazz Speakeasy", "Bill's Place", on West 133rd Street in Harlem in 2006.

Discography

As leader
 Beneath the Surface (Nilva, 1984) with John Hicks, Ray Drummond, Alvin Queen
 Atymony (Jazzline, 1993) with Carlos McKinney, Omar Avital, Noel Parris

As sideman
With Billy Gault
 When Destiny Calls (|SteepleChase, 1974)
With Dannie Richmond
 Ode to Mingus (Soul Note, 1979)With Ted Curson
 I Heard Mingus (Interplay, 1980)
With Big John Patton
 Blue Planet Man (Evidence, 1993)
With Jimmy Ponder
Mean Streets – No Bridges (Muse, 1987)

References

External links
 Official site

Hard bop saxophonists
American jazz tenor saxophonists
American male saxophonists
1946 births
Living people
People from Harlem
Jazz musicians from New York (state)
21st-century American saxophonists
21st-century American male musicians
American male jazz musicians